Hugo d'Assunção (born 8 November 1958) is a Portuguese judoka. He competed at the 1984 Summer Olympics and the 1988 Summer Olympics.

References

External links
 

1958 births
Living people
Portuguese male judoka
Olympic judoka of Portugal
Judoka at the 1984 Summer Olympics
Judoka at the 1988 Summer Olympics